Stefania Lazzaroni (born 10 July 1965) is a former Italian long jumper who was bronze medalist at the 1984 European Indoor Championships.

Career
Meteor of Italian athletics, she competed at a senior level for only four seasons from 1984 (18 years) to 1988 (22 years). Her golden year was certainly 1984, when, in addition to winning the Italian indoor championship with a personal best of 6.27 m, which was also a national record, she also won bronze medal at the European Championships in Gothenburg at the age of 18 and 237 days. and with this result he is the youngest Italian athlete ever successful in this feat.

National records
 Long jump indoor: 6.27 m ( Turin, 23 February 1984) - record holder until 3 February 1985.

Achievements

National titles
Lazzaroni won a national championship at individual senior level.
Italian Athletics Indoor Championships
Long jump: 1984

References

External links
 Stefania Lazzaroni at The Sports

1965 births
Living people
Italian female long jumpers
Sportspeople from Bergamo